Walter Singleton may refer to:
 Walter K. Singleton (1944–1967), United States Marine Corps sergeant and Medal of Honor recipient
 Walter J. Singleton, American journalist and civil servant